The Musone is a river in the Marche region of Italy. The source of the river is east of Matelica and south of Monte San Vicino in the province of Macerata. The river flows northeast near Apiro, Cingoli and Staffolo before crossing into the province of Ancona near Filottrano. The river then flows southeast and is joined by a tributary south of Osimo before curving northeast near Loreto. Finally, the river empties into the Adriatic Sea north of Porto Recanati and south of Numana.

References

Rivers of the Province of Macerata
Rivers of the Province of Ancona
Rivers of Italy
Adriatic Italian coast basins